Valentina Tutayeva (born 1953) is a Russian swimmer who won a silver medal in the 4×100 m medley relay at the 1970 European Aquatics Championships; individually, she finished fourth in the 200 m butterfly event. Between 1969 and 1972 she won one national title and set four national records in butterfly events. After retirement from senior swimming she competed in the masters category and set two national records in 1997 and 1998. She changed her last name to Karpus after marriage.

References

1953 births
Living people
Russian female butterfly swimmers
Soviet female butterfly swimmers
European Aquatics Championships medalists in swimming